Teleport Communications Group (TCG) was the first competitive local exchange carrier (CLEC) in the United States. It was founded in 1985 to compete with New York Telephone Company using fiber optics, and expanded to other major cities. The company was acquired by AT&T in 1998.

History
The company was formed as Teleport Communications in 1985 by Merrill Lynch as the private sector participant in the Port Authority of New York and New Jersey's "Teleport Project".  William Corley who ran the SI economic development took the vision forward to promote Jobs for the community. The Teleport Project envisioned a satellite earth station complex in Staten Island connected to the stock exchanges, financial services companies and corporate headquarters located in Manhattan.  Microwave connections were not feasible due to the congestion of New York's airwaves so Teleport Communications decided to utilize fiber optics for a network connecting satellite earth stations at The Teleport to customers in Manhattan.  However, the simultaneous advent of national fiber optic networks reduced the need for satellite communications, leaving Teleport Communications' network largely unused. Merrill Lynch hired former AT&T manager Robert Annunziata to develop a new strategy for Teleport Communications.  Annunziata's plan was revolutionary:  Teleport Communications would use the fiber optic network to compete with the New York Telephone Company, the historic monopoly telephone company in New York, and re-introduce competition for local telecom services.

Teleport Communications' service was very popular with long-distance carriers such as AT&T, MCI and Sprint who wanted to connect their long-distance networks to their largest customers without using the local telephone companies (the so-called regional Bell Operating Companies — RBOCs) which were perceived as strategic competitors that wanted to get into the long-distance business.  Teleport Communications' services were also popular with financial services companies that wanted duplicate and independent high speed connections between their New York area offices and the stock exchanges.

The financial services and long-distance companies quickly asked Teleport Communications to replicate its services in Boston.  Merrill Lynch formed a partnership with Fidelity Investments for Teleport Communications-Boston.  Similar expansions followed in Chicago, San Francisco, Houston and other major cities across the United States and the company was renamed Teleport Communications Group (TCG).  Merrill Lynch later sold TCG to the cable TV industry, with Cox initially taking a 20% ownership. The remaining 80% was subsequently sold to TCI, Comcast and Continental Cablevision. TCG and the cable companies then started to deploy jointly built fiber optic networks in many other cities. TCG then added carrier-grade Class 5 switches to the fiber optic networks to become the largest Competitive Local Exchange Carrier (CLEC), competing broadly with the traditional local telephone companies.

Critical to TCG's ability to compete with the traditional monopolies were a series of favorable decisions by state regulators, particularly in New York, Massachusetts and Illinois, which allowed TCG and other CLECs to interconnect as "peers" at reasonable rates.  These regulatory initiatives were ultimately codified and made applicable nationally through the federal Telecommunications Act of 1996.  The success of TCG and other CLECs demonstrated that competition was possible in the local telephone market.  This contributed to the passage of the Telecommunications Act of 1996 which eased the entrance of new CLECs by requiring the incumbent telephone companies, the largest being legacies of AT&T, to interconnect with the new entrants.

In 1998, TCG was acquired by AT&T for $12 billion.  At that time the publicly traded TCG (NASDAQ: TCGI) served 65 markets and generated $800 million in revenue.  Its largest investors were Cable Television companies TCI, Comcast and Cox Communications.

References 

Telecommunications companies of the United States